The 1989 European Parliament election, was the third European election to be held in the United Kingdom. It was held on 15 June. The electoral system was First Past the Post in England, Scotland and Wales and Single Transferable Vote in Northern Ireland. The turnout was again the lowest in Europe.

This election saw the best performance ever by the Green Party (UK) (formerly the Ecology Party), collecting over 2 million votes and 15% of the vote share. It had only received 70,853 as the Ecology Party in the previous election. However, because of First Past the Post system, the Green Party did not gain a single MEP, while the Scottish National Party received 1 seat with only 3% of the vote share. The Green Party's vote total of 2,299,287 remains its best performance in a national election, as does its percentage result of 14.5%.

The election also saw Labour overtake the Conservatives for the first time in any election since October 1974 and the first time ever in a European election, winning 13 more seats.

Results

United Kingdom

Overall (England, Scotland, Wales and Northern Ireland) turnout: 36% (EU average: 59%)
Overall votes cast: 15,896,078

Great Britain

Total votes cast: 15,361,267

Northern Ireland

Total votes cast – 534,811.

Party Leaders in 1989

Labour – Neil Kinnock
Conservative – Margaret Thatcher
Green – N/A (the Green Party did not have a leader)
Social and Liberal Democrats – Paddy Ashdown
Scottish National Party – Gordon Wilson
Plaid Cymru – Dafydd Elis Thomas
Democratic Unionist Party – Ian Paisley
Social Democratic and Labour Party – John Hume
Ulster Unionist Party – James Molyneaux

See also

Elections in the United Kingdom: European elections
List of members of the European Parliament for the United Kingdom (1989–1994)

References

1989
European Parliament election
United Kingdom
June 1989 events in the United Kingdom